Record Club is a musical project initiated by Beck Hansen in June 2009. 

The purpose of the project is to cover an entire album by another artist in one day, using an informal and fluid collective of musicians. Albums covered as of July 2010 are The Velvet Underground's The Velvet Underground & Nico, Leonard Cohen's Songs of Leonard Cohen, Skip Spence's Oar, INXS's Kick, and Yanni's Yanni Live at the Acropolis.  Video footage of every performance has been made available on Beck's website.

Albums covered
The Velvet Underground & Nico – The Velvet Underground (1967)
Songs of Leonard Cohen – Leonard Cohen (1967)
Oar – Skip Spence (1969)
Kick – INXS (1987)
Yanni Live at the Acropolis – Yanni (1994)

Musicians

The Velvet Underground and Nico

Nigel Godrich
Beck Hansen
Chris Holmes
Bram Inscore
Brian LeBarton
Thorunn Antonia Magnusdottir (Fields)
Giovanni Ribisi
Joey Waronker
Yo

Songs of Leonard Cohen
Devendra Banhart
Will Berman (MGMT)
Ben Goldwasser (MGMT)
Beck Hansen
Bram Inscore
Brian LeBarton
Binki Shapiro (Little Joy)
Andrew Stockdale (Wolfmother)
Andrew VanWyngarden (MGMT)

Oar
Leslie Feist
James Gadson
Beck Hansen
Brian LeBarton
Jamie Lidell
Wilco (as well as Jeff Tweedy's son Spencer on additional drums)

Kick
St. Vincent
Daniel Hart (longtime St. Vincent collaborator)
Sergio Dias (of Os Mutantes)
Angus Andrew (of Liars)
Julian Gross (of Liars)
Beck Hansen
Brian LeBarton

Yanni Live at the Acropolis
Thurston Moore of Sonic Youth
Tortoise
Beck Hansen
Various session musicians

References

External links
 Record Club at beck.com

Album series
Tribute albums
Beck
2009 establishments in the United States